More Than Somewhat – The Very Best of Steve Harley is a compilation album by Steve Harley, which was released by EMI in 1998. It features sixteen tracks recorded by Cockney Rebel, Steve Harley & Cockney Rebel and Harley as a solo artist, spanning from Cockney Rebel's 1973 debut album The Human Menagerie to Harley's 1996 solo album Poetic Justice. At least one song from each studio album is included, with the exception of Harley's 1979 album The Candidate.

More Than Somewhat – The Very Best of Steve Harley was the first Steve Harley/Cockney Rebel compilation to be released in the UK since 1992's Make Me Smile – The Best of Steve Harley and Cockney Rebel. More Than Somewhat was released in March 1998 and gave Harley his first appearance in the UK Albums Chart since Steve Harley & Cockney Rebel's 1977 album Face to Face: A Live Recording. The compilation reached number 82 and remained in the top 100 for two weeks.

Background
Harley was involved in choosing the track listing for the compilation and also wrote the sleeve notes for it. Speaking of his involvement, he told The Birmingham Post in 1998,

Promotion
Coinciding with the compilation's release was Harley's 1998 "Stripped to the Bare Bones" tour. This tour was Harley's first using his newly-developed acoustic format. Accompanied by instrumentalist Nick Pynn, the pair played over a hundred dates that year across the UK and Europe.

Release
More Than Somewhat was released by EMI Music on CD in the UK and Europe. The album received its first digital release on 1 March 2003 and was re-issued on CD by Phantom Import Distribution/EMI Music Distribution in 2004.

In 2000, the compilation was re-issued across Europe by Disky under the new title Best of the 70's. Another re-issue by Disky followed in 2005, but in the Netherlands only, as The Ultra Selection.

Critical reception

On its release, Bob Eborall of the Ealing Leader wrote, "A compilation from the artist who has been touring the country including 'Come Up and See Me'. Steve has also written the sleeve notes, making it a must for his fans. He is still an artist to reckon with." Neil McKay of Sunday Life stated, "Great glam singles from his brief 70s heyday succumb to later navel gazing material."

Track listing

Personnel
Production
 Steve Harley – producer (tracks 1–5, 7-9, 11–16)
 Alan Parsons – producer (tracks 1, 3–5, 11, 15)
 Neil Harrison – producer (track 6)
 Michael J. Jackson – producer (track 10)
 Mickie Most – producer (tracks 12–13, 16)
 Stuart Breed – remixer (track 16)

Other
 Steve Harley – liner notes

Charts

References

Steve Harley albums
Steve Harley & Cockney Rebel albums
1998 compilation albums
EMI Records compilation albums